Khin Maung Thein is a Burmese politician and political prisoner who currently serves as a Pyithu Hluttaw MP for Sagaing Township. In the 1990 Burmese general election, he was elected as an Pyithu Hluttaw MP, winning a majority of 15,367 (68% of the votes), but was never allowed to assume his seat.

Early life and education
Khin Maung Thein was born in
Khin-U, British Burma on December 3, 1940 .In 1969, he graduated from Mandalay University with a Bachelor of Science degree in chemistry. In 1983, he became a High Court advocate. In 1990, Khin Maung Thein was arrested and sentenced under the Burmese Penal Code Article 122 for attending a secret meeting in Mandalay to form a provisional civilian government and was released on 2 June 1992.

Political career
He is a member of the National League for Democracy. He was elected as a Pyithu Hluttaw MP and elected representative from Sagaing Township parliamentary constituency.

References

Members of Pyithu Hluttaw
National League for Democracy politicians
Prisoners and detainees of Myanmar
1940 births
Living people
People from Sagaing Region
Mandalay University alumni